Red Bluff Creek is a stream in Bandera and Kendall counties, Texas, in the United States.

Red Bluff Creek was so named from the reddish steep banks along the creek.

See also
List of rivers of Texas

References

Rivers of Bandera County, Texas
Rivers of Kendall County, Texas
Rivers of Texas